The Den Uyl Shadow Cabinet was a shadow cabinet formed by the Labour Party (PvdA), Democrats 66 (D'66) and the Political Party of Radicals (PPR) in preparation for the upcoming election of 1971 on 28 April 1971. The left-wing collaboration was a first time a shadow cabinet was formed in Dutch politics. It was based on the shadow cabinet in the Westminster system of government. Labour Party Member of the House of Representatives Ed van Thijn promised the idea as a basis for a proposed coalition after the election. After the election of 1971 and the formation of the First Biesheuvel cabinet, the shadow cabinet was disbanded 2 July 1971. One year later after the election of 1972 the basis of the shadow cabinet was used as a template for the formation of the Den Uyl cabinet.

Composition

Ministers

State Secretaries

References

1971 establishments in the Netherlands
1971 disestablishments in the Netherlands
Shadow cabinets